Aapki Nazron Ne Samjha is an Indian television drama series which aired from 2 March 2021 to 9 October 2021 on StarPlus. The series is a remake of Star Jalsha's Bengali series Sanjher Baati. Set in Dwarka and produced by Full House Media, it starred Vijayendra Kumeria, Richa Rathore and Narayani Shastri.

Plot
The story begins with Darsh Rawal receiving an award for his photographic skills at an event in Paris. Despite being deprived of his eyesight, Darsh possesses amazing photography skills. He can sense and visualize the whole world through his mind, and never lets his disability bring him down. But soon, his mother Rajvi becomes concerned about his marriage. Elsewhere in Dwarka, Nandini prepares for her sister, Bansuri's, marriage, but is caught in a storm near the sea harbor. Darsh risks his life and saves Nandini. Bansuri's prospective mother-in-law, Vanlata then demands huge sums of money and a variety of other gifts as dowry from Nandini for her sister's wedding. Lying about requesting a washing machine, Vanlata forces Nandini to accompany her sister as a household helper until she buys one.

Elsewhere, Rajvi hosts a party to celebrate Darsh's success and homecoming to Dwarka after three years, but he is insulted by some guests for being disabled. Rajvi becomes very tense upon listening to them and vows to find a suitable bride for her son in 30 days who would heartily accept him with all his shortcomings. Rajvi fixes Darsh's marriage with Tosha, but the alliance does not work out. Due to a misunderstanding, Rajvi takes a disliking to Nandini and asks her to leave Dwarka while Darsh falls for Nandini. Rajvi fixes his marriage with his childhood friend, Nirali, unaware that she is already married to Aman (Raakla) after both Tosha and Nirali's truth is revealed, Rajvi starts liking Nandini.

Darsh admits that he has fallen in love with Nandini and Rajvi goes to request Nandini's hand for marriage. Vanlata (initially) taunts her and refuses, but later agrees to Darsh and Nandini's marriage on the condition that Shobhit has to marry Gunjan. Rajvi pleads to Shobhit, who jumps at the chance to redeem himself for causing Darsh's blindness. Rajvi and Shobhit reunite. While Darsh and Nandini's romance brews, Gunjan taunts Shobhit and takes advantage of his kindness. Knowing that Darsh always wanted his wedding to take place in Goa, Nandini tells Rajvi and soothes the family to leave for Goa for the weddings. On the wedding day, Nandini is kidnapped by Moped, who attempts to marry her, but she escapes. Namrata lies to Shamika about Nandini and convinces her to sit in Nandini's place.

But Darsh realizes that she isn't Nandini, leaving Rajvi to confront the family for taking such a decision without her knowledge. Nandini returns to the mandap and the two weddings proceed. During the marriage rituals, Charmi tells Darsh in private that Nandini told Rajvi that she will marry Darsh only if Shobhit marries Gunjan. Darsh fumes with anger and vows to get revenge on Nandini, not aware that Vanlata made the deal without Nandini's knowledge. Shobhit meanwhile vows to create a rift between Darsh and Nandini for ruining his chance to marry Charmi, unaware that Darsh already hates Nandini because of the misunderstanding. Soon the Rawals witness Darsh and Nandini fight, and learn why he hates Nandini. Rajvi takes a strong stand for Nandini and tells him that Vanlata was behind it, and Nandini did not know anything.

Darsh tries to apologize for ruining Nandini's life, but she leaves and returns to her village in Okha. While Darsh goes after her to win her back, Shobhit is left devastated when he learns that Charmi has died. Despite his attempts to win her back, Nandini refuses to return home with Darsh. Bansuri and Rajvi create a plan due to which Nandini is forced to return to the Rawals. She agrees to work as Darsh's assistant until she pays back the wedding expenses. Darsh meets Ritesh, who Shobhit plans to use to separate Darsh and Nandini. He deliberately causes Darsh to doubt Nandini and Ritesh's relationship, even going as far as to get pictures taken out of context. The family confronts Nandini for betraying Darsh. Nandini is left heartbroken and leaves the Rawals.

Charmi is revealed to be alive and confronts Shobhit for his evil intentions against Darsh and Nandini. Shocked and left feeling guilty, he confesses to the family about Nandini's innocence and her surprise operation to regain Darsh's eyesight. He leaves with Darsh to find Nandini. On the other hand, Nandini witnesses a fatal car accident and attempts to help the passengers, during which she drops her purse and phone. Shobhit reaches the accident spot and misunderstands that the deceased woman is Nandini. As Darsh undergoes his operation, the Rawals are left devastated with the news of Nandini's assumed demise and decide to hide it from Darsh. Nandini adopts Vini, who believes that she is her mother.

13 days later
Nandini raises Vini as her daughter and vows to pay back the loan that Jhunjhunwala has borrowed with interest. While Shobhit and Gunjan live separately, preparations for Nandini's terahvin begin at the Rawal mansion. Darsh decides to head home a day earlier than expected as he desires to meet Nandini. This leaves the Rawals shocked and unable to perform Nandini's terahvin. Darsh removes his eye patches and assumes Charmi to be Nandini. Later, Darsh reaches Porbandar to thank Mr. Jhunjhunwala and Darsh feels that Charmi is not Nandini, but he convinces himself that Charmi is Nandini.

Later, Darsh recognizes the real Nandini and confronts Rajvi for hiding the truth. He also realizes that Rajvi told Charmi to pretend to be Nandini. Rajvi was told that they did the last rites of Nandini, but little did she know that Nandini was alive and she saw her two days earlier. Darsh breaks all ties with Rajvi and rushes to Nandini. He confesses his love to Nandini and they reunite. Rajvi gets stabbed and Darsh gets arrested. Later, it is revealed that Gunjan stabbed Rajvi. Rajvi regains consciousness and Charmi kills Gunjan.

After being proven innocent, Darsh is released from prison. Charmi becomes obsessed with Darsh and wants to remove Nandini from his life.

Darsh and Shobhit's sister, Namrata returns home after (apparently) being physically abused by her husband, Aatish, but this is later revealed to be a lie, as she is actually trying to get a divorce from her husband because she can't stand living in a poor area, the Rawals presses charges against Aatish for domestic violence (initially) unaware that they have been deceived by Namrata. But Nandini discoveries that Aatish is in fact innocent and tries to expose Namrata's true colours to the Rawals.

Initially, Nandini's attempts were stopped by both Charmi and Namrata respectively, but she ultimately exposes Namrata's true colours, as well as proves that Aatish is innocent to the Rawals, after which they apologise to both Aatish and Nandini respectively for not believing them regarding Namrata's true colours, but they also disown Namrata for good due to her disgusting actions, as well as the fact that she had deceived them into (unknowingly) committing a sin for own selfish benefit.

Nandini comes across a woman named Toral who is mentally unstable. After Toral enters Rawals' house, Rajvi starts to get insecure. After a series of events, Charmi's crimes are exposed and she is arrested and sent the prison for her crimes, even after Charmi's crimes were exposed, she still tries to justify her disgusting actions by stating that everything that she did was for Darsh, but in truth, everything she did was actually for herself, proving just how delusional and mentally unstable Charmi truly is.

Toral is also revealed to be Darsh's biological mother who was admitted to a mental health institution for treatment 28 years ago. Vipul marries Rajvi so that Darsh becomes her son. Nandini is revealed to be pregnant and the series ends on a happy note.

Cast

Main
Vijayendra Kumeria as Darsh Rawal - Toral and Vipul's son, Rajvi's step-son, Shobhit and Namrata's half-brother, Nandini's husband and Vini's adoptive father.
 Richa Rathore as Nandini "ATM" Rawal - Bansuri's sister, Darsh's wife and Vini's adoptive mother.
 Kritika Singh Yadav / Aditi Rathore as Charmi - Shobhit's ex-girlfriend and Darsh's obsessive ex-lover.
Narayani Shastri as Rajvi Vipul Rawal - Vipul's second wife, Namrata and Shobhit's mother, and Darsh's step-mother.

Recurring
Saurabh Agarwal as Vipul Rawal - Keshav's elder son, Chetan's brother, Toral and Rajvi's husband, Namrata, Darsh and Shobhit's father.
Sucheta Khanna as Toral Vipul Rawal - Vipul's first wife and Darsh's mother.
Abhishek Verma as Shobhit Rawal - Rajvi and Vipul's younger son, Namrata's younger brother, Darsh's half-brother, Charmi's ex-fiancé and Gunjan's husband.
Miloni Kapadia as Gunjan Parekh Rawal - Naveen's daughter and Shobhit's wife, Rakla's ex girlfriend.
Renee Dhyani/Vaishnavi Dhanraj/Kshitisha Soni as Namrata Rawal Desai - Rajvi and Vipul's daughter, Shobhit's elder sister, Darsh's half-sister and Aatish's wife.
Ankit Gulati as Aatish Desai - Namrata's husband.
Bharat Pahuja as Keshav Rawal - Vipul and Chetan's father, and Namrata, Darsh and Shobhit's grandfather.
Pankit Thakker as Chetan Rawal - Keshav's younger son, Vipul's brother and Parul's husband.
Saee Barve as Parul Rawal - Chetan's wife.
Mahi Soni as Vini Rawal - Ishani's daughter; Darsh and Nandini's adopted daughter.
Ashish Kulkarni as Naveen Parekh - Bansuri's husband and Gunjan's father.
Revati Lele as Bansuri Parekh - Nandini's sister and Naveen's wife.
Purvi Vyas as Vanlata Parekh - Naveen's mother.
Ayaz Ahmed as Rakla - Nirali's husband, Gunjan's ex-boyfriend.
Ketaki Kadam as Nirali - Darsh's childhood friend and ex-fiancée and Rakla's wife 
Abigail Jain as Shamika - Darsh's ex-girlfriend.
Varun Sharma as Dr. Ritesh Barot - Nandini's childhood friend.
Dolly Chawla as Neetika - Darsh's ex-fiancée.
Riyaz Panjwani as Mr. Jhunjhunwala - Darsh's business partner and investor.
Unknown as Ishani Jhunjhunwala - Mr. Jhunjhunwala's daughter.
Radhika Pandit as herself.

Production

Casting
Earlier, Shivin Narang was approached to play Darsh before Vijayendra Kumeria was signed by the makers. In an interview Kumeria called his blind role to be the most difficult character of his career.

Preparation
 Vijayendra Kumeria took inspiration from various films having impaired protagonists, attended workshops and reduced weight to fit into Darsh's character. Actress Richa Rathore, who was cast as Nandini, attended several workshops to understand and master the Gujarati dialect.

Filming
Based on the backdrop of Dwarka in Gujarat, the series is mainly filmed at Film City in Mumbai. Some initial sequences were shot in Dwarka in early February 2021.

On 14 April 2021, due to the sudden COVID-19 Rules set by the Chief Minister of Maharashtra, Uddhav Thackeray, the shooting halted. Later, the production house planned to move their shoot location to Goa until the next hearings from the government but after Goa too announced a lockdown, the sets were once again shifted to Silvassa, Gujarat.

Release
The first promo was released on 8 February 2021 featuring the leads, and the show premiered on 2 March 2021.

Reception
From 2 March 2021 to 4 September 2021, Aapki Nazron Ne Samjha aired every Monday to Saturday from 6:00 PM IST to 6:30 PM IST. The premiere episode of the show garnered 1.1 TRP while averaging 1.0 TRP in its debut week.

Soundtrack

The title song Aapki Nazron Ne Samjha is a remake of the song Aapki Nazron Ne Samja from the 1962 film Anpadh, originally composed by Madan Mohan, written by Raja Mehdi Ali Khan and sung by Lata Mangeshkar. The song was recreated for the series with the music composed by Sargam Jassu and Nakash Aziz and sung by Palak Muchhal and Sreerama Chandra.

Adaptations

References

External links

Website
Production Website

StarPlus original programming
2021 Indian television series debuts
2021 Indian television series endings
Hindi-language television shows
Indian television soap operas